Federico Crovari was born on April 20, 1975 in Milan, Italy) and is famous for his role as midfielder in an association football league. Crovari had played for a number of teams, mostly at Serie B level, before finally retiring in January 2009 when at Padova due to a recurring back injury.

Following his retirement, he rescinded his contract with Padova but stayed at the club, this time working as a scout. He was formally appointed as a scout by his club in July 2009.

References

1975 births
Living people
Italian footballers
L.R. Vicenza players
Association football midfielders
Serie A players
Serie B players
A.C. Monza players
S.S. Lazio players
Treviso F.B.C. 1993 players
Calcio Padova players
A.S.D. SolbiaSommese Calcio players